Novi asistent ("New Assistant") is a 1964 Yugoslavian television series based on A. J. Cronin's stories about the fictional physician Dr. Finlay. The series was directed by Mirjana Samardžić and starred Dejan Dubajić, Ljiljana Jovanović, Nikola Simić, and Milan Srdoč.

External links 

Medical television series
1960s Yugoslav television series
1964 Yugoslav television series debuts
Period television series
Yugoslav drama television series
1960s comedy television series
Television shows based on works by A. J. Cronin
Television shows set in Serbia
Television shows filmed in Serbia